The National Photographic Portrait Prize is an annual portraiture competition held at the National Portrait Gallery in Canberra, Australia.

In earlier years VISA was the major sponsor of the prize.

Past winners
2007 — Robert Scott-Mitchell 
2009 — Ingvar Kenne 
2010 — Scott Bycroft 
2011 — Jacqueline Mitelman
2012 — Roderick McNicol 
2013 — Janelle Low
2014 — Andrew Cowe
2015 — Hoda Afshar
2016 — Elizabeth Looker
2017 — Gary Grealy
2018 — Lee Grant
2019 — Alana Holmberg
2020 — Rob Palmer
2021 — Joel B. Pratley
2022 — Wayne Quilliam

Highly Commended
2014 — David Apostol
2015 — Katherine Williams
2016 — Sean Davey
2017 — John Benavente; Brett Canet-Gibson
2018 — Filomena Rizzo
2019 — Alex Vaughan
2020 — Hugh Stewart
2021 — Julian Kingma
2022 — Adam Ferguson

People's Choice
2012 — John McRae 
2015 — Natalie Grono
2016 — Matthew Newton
2017 — Brett Canet-Gibson
2018 — Harold David
2019 — Kate Atkinson
2020 — Klarissa Dempsey
2022 — Luther Tora

Art Handlers' Prize 
 2017 — Tobias Titz
 2018 — Stephanie Simcox
2019 — Elizabeth Looker
2020 — Shea Kirk
2021 — Kristina Kraskov
2022 — Adam Haddrick

Notable exhibiting finalists
 Nigel Brennan
 Jane Burton
 Rozalind Drummond
 Alex Frayne
 Trent Parke
 Robin Sellick
 Dean Sewell
 Alexia Sinclair
 Mark Tedeschi
 Mia Wasikowska
 Greg Weight
 Anne Zahalka
 Andrew Rovenko

References

Australian art awards
Portrait art
Photography in Australia
Awards established in 2007
2007 establishments in Australia